João Pedro Borges Saudade Garcia (born 15 December 1995 in Ribeira Grande) aka Xéxé, is a Portuguese footballer who plays for Ideal as a forward.

Football career
On 11 May 2014, Xéxé made his professional debut with Santa Clara in a 2013–14 Segunda Liga match against Sporting Covilhã.

References

External links

Stats and profile at LPFP 

1995 births
Living people
People from Ribeira Grande, Azores
Portuguese footballers
Association football forwards
Liga Portugal 2 players
C.D. Santa Clara players
CU Micaelense players